Supernumerary town (") was a type of a city in the Russian Empire which was not an administrative center of any territory.

During the reign of Catherine II of Russia, when an uezd was disbanded, its administratice centre typically lost its status as a city, with the corresponding loss of city privileges of its inhabitants. To bypass this, a new category of urban settlements was introduced.

The 1796 reform of the administrative division by Emperor Paul I of Russia decreased the number of uyezds and their centers were reclassified as supernumerary towns. The reform established the population number as a criterion for a supernumerary town.

In the second half of the 19th century the governorate centres constituted 8 percent of cities, uezd cities counted 71 percent,  and supernumerary towns counted 21 percent.

Over time the term zashtatny gorod has acquired the meaning of an insignificant/backwater city.

See also
Mestechko (disambiguation)
Posad

References

Government of the Russian Empire
Types of cities
History of the administrative divisions of Russia